Xiayuan (下元站) is a railway station in Xiayuan, Huangpu District, Guangzhou, Guangdong, China. It is a station on the Guangshen Railway and managed by the Guangshen Railway Company. It was built in 1975 and is a class 3 station on the national railway station scale.

References

Railway stations in China opened in 1975
Railway stations in Guangdong
Stations on the Guangzhou–Shenzhen Railway